Michael Anthony Morton (born  March 28, 1972) is an National Football League (NFL) official and former American football linebacker. Morton played college football for the University of North Carolina Tar Heels and went on to play for four teams in a seven-year NFL career. During his NFL career. Morton played in 103 games (17 starts) and recorded 120 tackles, 50 assists, four fumble recoveries, and two interceptions. He was a member of the 1999 St. Louis Rams team that won Super Bowl XXXIV in January 2000.

Since his retirement from playing in the NFL, Morton has become a dentist and has opened his practice in Kannapolis, North Carolina.

Morton has been a football official since at least 2014, working in the Atlantic Coast Conference. , Morton is also an official in the Alliance of American Football, working as an umpire on the crew led by referee Brandon Cruse. Morton worked his first NFL game on September 11, 2022, when the Atlanta Falcons hosted the New Orleans Saints, making him the first NFL official that also won a Super Bowl. He works on Alex Kemp's crew.

Morton and his wife are the parents of a son, as well as quadruplets.

References

External links
 http://www.mikemortondentistry.com

1972 births
Living people
American dentists
American football linebackers
Green Bay Packers players
Indianapolis Colts players
North Carolina Tar Heels football players
St. Louis Rams players
Oakland Raiders players
Players of American football from North Carolina
People from Concord, North Carolina
People from Kannapolis, North Carolina